Jean-Yves Stephane Marcel Raimbaud (27 February 1958 – 28 June 1998) was a French animator and screenwriter. He is best known for creating the animated series, Oggy and the Cockroaches that officially debuted posthumously on 6 September 1998, on France 3. He also co-created Space Goofs with Philippe Traversat, the first show he made co-produced by Gaumont Multimedia and Xilam.

Raimbaud died in June 1998, having had lung cancer for some time.

Early life 
Raimbaud was born on 27 February 1958, in Évreux, France. At age 14, he abandoned his studies in favor of training as a painter in words. Thus, he made his debut in drawing, although initially, he mainly drew billboards.

Career 
In 1975, he joined a then-small animation studio called DIC Entertainment created by Jean Chalopin. This was where he learned to make cartoons. In the studio, he met directors like Bruno Bianchi (Inspector Gadget), Bernard Deyriès (The Mysterious Cities of Gold), etc. In the 1980s, he helped launch the series Ulysses 31. He decided to pursue his career in Paris. He contributed to Albert Barillé's series, Once Upon a Time... Space and Once Upon a Time... Life.

In 1986, Raimbaud created his own studio, Jingle, with Christian Masson (advertising and producer). 25 people under them outsourced series like Spartakus and the Sun Beneath the Sea and Rahan. A year later, the company stood out with productions such as Mimi Cracra (A2), Walter Melon (Canal+) and Les Enfants de la Liberté (FR3). It was not until 1988 that Jingle itself made a series: Manu created by cartoonist Frank Margerin. Thus, 104 episodes were broadcast on La Cinq, starting in March 1990. The challenge of Raimbaud was not to create tasteless cartoons for children only. In 1992, the bankruptcy and liquidation of La Cinq caused the closure of many production companies. In 1993, Jingle itself became bankrupt.

Gaumont Multimedia 
By then, Raimbaud was known in the community and Gaumont Film Company hired him to revive the films of Asterix and Lucky Luke, that were last produced in the 1970s. Promoted artistic director of the then-new studio Gaumont Multimedia, he began working on Highlander: The Series for M6. At the same time, he created the series The Little Witches, the story of Sherilyn and her apprentice witches who use their magical powers to thwart the diabolical plans of a businessman. This series was produced by Millésime Productions for TF1 and it will be sold very little in Europe. Raimbaud came up with an idea he could not have realized at Jingle – a story of shipwrecked aliens on Earth who took refuge in a house for rent. With writer Philippe Traversat, he created the series Les Zinzins de L'espace, similar to 1950's American cartoons, akin to titles like Looney Tunes. It was localized as Space Goofs and co-produced by Xilam, during its broadcast on France 3 in September 1997. Against all odds, the series became the most popular among programs introduced the same year, becoming a hit worldwide.

Illness and death 
Raimbaud was diagnosed with lung cancer in the early 1990s, and died on 28 June 1998, in Paris, France, from a colorectal infection caused by the tumor. His series, Oggy and the Cockroaches, was released posthumously.

Legacy 
Space Goofs became a success and remained one of his most popular works throughout the years, gaining a lot of views on its official YouTube channel. The series' theme song ("Monster Men", by Iggy Pop) was released as a single, ended up being greenlit for a second season in the 2000's, had received several home video releases, an unreleased film adaptation and a video game adaptation co-produced by Ubi Soft Entertainment, in 2001.

Having died in 1998, Raimbaud did not live to take advantage of the success of his more cult series, Oggy and the Cockroaches, which premiered on France 3 months after his death. However, it became an extremely successful hit after being broadcast worldwide for many years. It aired on channels including Cartoon Network, Nickelodeon, and Teletoon. It had widespread popularity in several countries, mainly India. It ended up being more popular than Space Goofs, which curiously enough was where the eponymous characters (Oggy and the cockroach trio) debuted.

Xilam had still held the copyrights of the television shows he created by then. While any sort of revival for Space Goofs had not been considered, Oggy and the Cockroaches had become Xilam's longest running franchise – receiving seven seasons in total, an album by composer Hugues Le Bars, a film adaptation, a preschool spinoff (Oggy Oggy) and a sequel spinoff (Oggy and the Cockroaches: Next Generation).

References

External links
 

1958 births
1998 deaths
French animators
20th-century French screenwriters
People from Évreux
Deaths from lung cancer